The Bye Bye Man is a 2017 American supernatural horror film directed by Stacy Title (in her final directed film before her death) and written by Jonathan Penner, based on the chapter "The Bridge to Body Island" in Robert Damon Schneck's book The President's Vampire. The film stars Douglas Smith, Lucien Laviscount, Cressida Bonas, Doug Jones, Carrie-Anne Moss, Faye Dunaway, and Jenna Kanell.

Principal photography began on November 2, 2015, in Cleveland, Ohio. STXfilms released the film on January 13, 2017. The film received negative reviews from critics, and grossed $29 million worldwide on a budget of $7.4 million.

Plot 
In 1969, a mass murder occurs in Madison, Wisconsin, during which a man kills people on his block. As he shoots the neighbors, he continuously asks if anyone spoke about "the name" that cannot be said. He repeats over and over: "Don't say it, don't think it; don't think it, don't say it".

In the present day, Elliot, his girlfriend Sasha, and friend John move into an off-campus house not far from their college. Soon, mysterious things start to happen, such as Sasha developing a strange cough and Elliot finding coins in a nightstand that continually reappear. Elliot also finds writing consisting of "don't think it, don't say it", and a name - the Bye Bye Man. During a séance involving their friend Kim, the name is mentioned.

Sasha continues to become sick as Elliot and John start experiencing hallucinations and stranger activity. Elliot begins to suspect that Sasha is cheating on him with John, as Elliot's brother Virgil had said at the party before the Bye Bye Man was released. A librarian shows Elliot a dossier about the Bye Bye Man. A teenager killed his family and told a reporter that the Bye Bye Man made him do it. The same reporter later became a mass shooter during the '60s, who killed himself after realizing people knew about the Bye Bye Man. Kim is killed when she is struck by a train. Elliot is taken in for questioning by Detective Shaw, and is released when Kim's suicide note reveals she killed her roommate and was planning on killing Elliot, Sasha, and John.

Elliot also visits the widow of the reporter, who reveals that the curse causes insanity, hallucinations, and eventually, death. Signs of his coming are coins mysteriously appearing, sounds of a train, and a large, skinless hound. The only way to prevent it is to not think of his name or speak of him. If someone already knows, they must be killed. The librarian is hit by Elliot's car by accident after she killed everyone in her home, coming for Elliot next.

Sasha and John are also suffering from hallucinations. Elliot finds John stabbing Sasha. He shoots John, but after he picks up the corpse, Sasha  is revealed to have been stabbing John. The Bye Bye Man appears and Elliot hallucinates. Elliot keeps Virgil and his daughter Alice away long enough for him to kill himself with a gun. Virgil and Alice get away before the entire house goes up in flames.

While riding home, Alice reveals she found the coins from the nightstand near the trash, along with the writing, but she could not read it in the dark. Detective Shaw arrives at the scene, where John is found to be alive, but wounded. John then whispers the name to Shaw, allowing the Bye Bye Man's curse to spread again.

Cast 
 Douglas Smith as Elliot
 Lucien Laviscount as John
 Cressida Bonas as Sasha
 Doug Jones as the Bye Bye Man
 Carrie-Anne Moss as Detective Shaw
 Faye Dunaway as Widow Redmon
Keelin Woodell as Young Widow Redmon
 Michael Trucco as Virgil
 Cleo King as Mrs. Watkins
 Jenna Kanell as Kim Hines
 Erica Tremblay as Alice
 Leigh Whannell as Larry
 Jonathan Penner as Mr. Daizy

Production 
On September 11, 2014, TWC-Dimension acquired the worldwide distribution rights to the then-forthcoming supernatural thriller film The Bye Bye Man. Jonathan Penner adapted the script from "The Bridge to Body Island", a chapter in Robert Damon Schneck's fiction book The President's Vampire (Anomalist Books 2005; later retitled The Bye-Bye Man and Other Strange-But-True Tales when reprinted by Penguin-Random House in 2016.) "The Bridge to Body Island" tells an allegedly true story that was related to Schneck.

Stacy Title directed the film, which Intrepid Pictures produced, with its founder Trevor Macy. On June 23, 2015, Los Angeles Media Fund came on board to finance and co-produce the film. Jeffrey Soros and Simon Horsman also produced the film through LAMF. On November 4, 2015, STX Entertainment acquired the worldwide distribution rights to the film, and also co-financed the film. David Prior also adapted the book, along with Penner. Melinda Nishioka was a co-producer.

Principal photography on the film began on November 2, 2015, in Cleveland, Ohio, and wrapped on December 11, 2015.

The Newton Brothers composed the music for the film. Sony Classical Records has released the soundtrack featuring a song performance by the composers and Richard Patrick.

Release 
The Bye Bye Man was released on January 13, 2017. It had originally been scheduled for October 14, 2016, before being moved up to June 3, 2016, and later pushed back to December 9, 2016.

Box office 
The Bye Bye Man grossed $22.4 million in the United States and Canada and $4.3 million in other territories, for a worldwide total of $26.7 million, against a production budget of $7.4 million.

In North America, the film was released alongside the openings of Monster Trucks and Sleepless, as well as the wide releases of Silence, Patriots Day, and Live by Night, and was expected to gross around $10 million from 2,220 theaters in its opening weekend. It ended up opening to $13.2 million, finishing above expectations and 4th at the box office.

Critical response 
On review aggregator website Rotten Tomatoes, the film has an approval rating of 19% based on 89 reviews and an average rating of 3.70/10. The site's critical consensus reads, "The Bye Bye Man clumsily mashes together elements from better horror films, adding up to a derivative effort as short on originality as it is on narrative coherency or satisfying scares." On Metacritic, the film has a score of 37 out of 100 based on 22 critics, indicating "generally unfavorable reviews". Audiences polled by CinemaScore gave the film an average grade of "C" on an A+ to F scale.

A. A. Dowd of The A.V. Club said, "on top of the general hoariness, this is also an uncommonly, at times unbelievably inept movie; from its acting to its script to most of its technical aspects, it feels barely fit for the big screen. The Bye Bye Man is so bad, in fact, that it retroactively improves the half-assed Hollywood horror that it’d be lucky to better resemble." Kalyn Corrigan, writing for Bloody Disgusting, said the film had "poorly developed characters", a "muddled mythology", and "horribly shoddy editing", ultimately giving the film a 2/5 rating.  Jake Dee for JoBlo.com said "in a room full of 200 or so public patrons, the film drew far more auditory laughs than terrified gasps," and awarded it a 3/10 rating.

References

External links 
 

2017 films
2017 horror films
2010s supernatural horror films
American supernatural horror films
Demons in film
Films about curses
Films based on short fiction
Films directed by Stacy Title
Films scored by the Newton Brothers
Films about suicide
Films set in 1969
Films set in Madison, Wisconsin
Films shot in Cleveland
Huayi Brothers films
Intrepid Pictures films
STX Entertainment films
2010s English-language films
2010s American films
Internet memes
Internet memes introduced in 2017
Films about mass murder
Murder–suicide in films